The Sanyo S750/S750i are two mobile (Cellular) phones released by Sanyo in 2004 for Orange UK.

The phones are now discontinued.

Orange mobile phones
Mobile phones introduced in 2004
S750
Discontinued products